The Junius manuscript is one of the four major codices of Old English literature. Written in the 10th century, it contains poetry dealing with Biblical subjects in Old English, the vernacular language of Anglo-Saxon England. Modern editors have determined that the manuscript is made of four poems, to which they have given the titles Genesis, Exodus, Daniel, and Christ and Satan.  The identity of their author is unknown. For a long time, scholars believed them to be the work of Cædmon, accordingly calling the book the Cædmon manuscript. This theory has been discarded due to the significant differences between the poems.

The manuscript owes its current designation to the Anglo-Dutch scholar Franciscus Junius, who was the first to edit its contents and who bequeathed it to Oxford University. It is kept in the Bodleian Library under shelfmark MS Junius 11.

Name and date

The codex now referred to as the "Junius manuscript" was formerly called the "Cædmon manuscript" after an early theory that the poems it contains were the work of Cædmon; the theory is no longer considered credible, therefore the manuscript it is commonly referred to either by its Bodleian Library shelf mark "MS Junius 11", or more casually as "the Junius manuscript" or "Codex Junius". 'Junius' in these is Franciscus Junius, who published the first edition of its contents in 1655.

It has been established on palaeographical grounds that compilation of the manuscript began c. AD 1000. Recent work has suggested an earlier, narrow window for the likely compilation date to 960-1000 for Liber I and shortly thereafter for Liber II, based on an integrated dating of the text, paleography, and illustrations.

The compilation was in two stages: Liber I contains the poems Genesis, Exodus, and Daniel, and was the work of a single scribe. Liber II contains the poem Christ and Satan. The manuscript contains numerous illustrations that are an example of the Winchester style of drawing, typical of the period and region; it appears that two illustrators worked independently on the manuscript. The first scribe left spaces in the text for other illustrations which were never completed.

Illustrations
The manuscript is partly illustrated with a series of line drawings depicting the events in the text.  From spaces left by the scribes, it appears that it was intended that the manuscript be fully illustrated; in the event, the work was left unfinished after only about a third of the artwork had been drawn. This scheme of illustrations, which is unparalleled in other manuscripts of Anglo-Saxon poetry, implies that the manuscript was conceived of as being considerably more important than most vernacular texts; it may have been intended for devotional or didactic use.

Contents
The names of the poems themselves are modern inventions; they are not given titles in the manuscript.  As with the majority of Anglo-Saxon writing, the poems are anonymous and their provenance and dating are uncertain.

Genesis

Genesis is a paraphrase of the first part of the biblical book of Genesis, from the Creation through to the test of Abraham's faith with the sacrifice of Isaac (Gen. 22).

The work is now recognised as a composite work formed of two originally distinct parts, conventionally referred to as Genesis A and Genesis B; the latter, lines 235-851 of the poem as we have it, appears to have been interpolated from an older poem to produce the current text.

It is Genesis B which has attracted the most critical attention.  Its origin is notable in that it appears to be a translation from a ninth-century Old Saxon original; this theory was originally made on metrical grounds, in 1875 by the German scholar Sievers, and then confirmed by the discovery of a fragment of Old Saxon verse that appears to correspond to part of the work in 1894. Thematically and stylistically, it is distinctive: it tells the story of the falls of Satan and Man in an epic style, and has been suggested as an influence for Beowulf, and even, perhaps, for Milton's Paradise Lost.

Exodus

Exodus is not a paraphrase of the biblical book, but rather a retelling of the story of the Israelites' Flight from Egypt and the Crossing of the Red Sea in the manner of a "heroic epic", much like Old English poems Andreas, Judith, or even the non-religious Beowulf. It is one of the densest, most allusive and complex poems in Old English, and is the focus of much critical debate.

Exodus brings a traditional "heroic style" to its biblical subject-matter. Moses is treated as a general, and military imagery pervades the battle scenes. The destruction of the Egyptians in the Red Sea is narrated in much the same way as a formulaic battle scene from other Old English poems, including a 'Beast of Battle' motif very common in the poetry.

The main story is suspended at one point to tell the stories of Noah and Abraham's sacrifice of Isaac. Some scholars consider this change of subject a feature of the "epic style" comparable with the similar digressions in Beowulf, while others have proposed it is a later interpolation. Edward B. Irving edited the poem twice, 1955 and 1981: the first edition excerpted the Noah and Abraham portion as a separate poem; on later reflection, Irving recanted, admitting it was an integrated part of the Exodus poem. There appears to be justification in patristic sermons for connecting the crossing of the Red Sea with these topics.

In recent decades, attention has shifted away from the "heroic" aspects of Exodus to consider its densely allusive structure and possible typology. Peter J. Lucas, for instance, has argued that the poem is an allegorical treatment of the Christian's fight with the devil. The Crossing of the Red Sea has been seen as echoing the Baptismal liturgy and prefiguring the entrance into Heaven. The Pharaoh may be associated with Satan through some subtle verbal echoes. However, these readings are still controversial and much-debated. A more balanced view would accept that though certain intermittent parts of the narrative of Exodus merge into typological allusion, this is not sustained throughout the poem.

Daniel

A short paraphrase of the book of Daniel, dwelling particularly on the story of the Fiery Furnace, deals with the first five chapters of the Book of Daniel.

Christ and Satan

A three-part poem detailing the Fall of Satan, Christ's harrowing of Hell (from the Apocryphal New Testament Gospel of Nicodemus), and Christ's temptation in the desert.

Facsimiles
  The Cædmon manuscript of Anglo-Saxon Biblical poetry: Junius XI in the Bodleian , ed. by Israel Gollancz (London: Oxford University Press, 1927.)
Digital facsimiles are available online and offline:
 A complete digital facsimile is available through digital Bodleian.
A complete digital facsimile with copious annotations, transcriptions and translations was released on CD format in 2004:

Editions
 Several poems from MS Junius 11 are edited to digital images of their manuscript pages, and translated, in the Old English Poetry in Facsimile Project

See also
Anglo-Saxon literature
Exeter Book
History of the English Bible
Nowell Codex
Old English Bible translations
Vercelli Book

References

Further reading
 .
 
 .
 
 
 
 .
 
 .
 
 .

External links 

Bodleian Medieval Manuscripts Catalogue Entry
Encyclopædia Britannica Cædmon manuscript
The Gutenberg project edition of Codex Junius

1655 books
English poetry collections
Old English poems
Christian illuminated manuscripts
Literary illuminated manuscripts
Later Anglo-Saxon illuminated manuscripts
English manuscripts
Bodleian Library collection
10th-century illuminated manuscripts